St. Mark's Church is a historic Episcopal church located at Port Leyden in Lewis County, New York. It is a frame board and batten sided, three by five bay structure built in 1865 in the Gothic Revival style.

It was listed on the National Register of Historic Places in 1998.

References

Churches on the National Register of Historic Places in New York (state)
Episcopal church buildings in New York (state)
Carpenter Gothic church buildings in New York (state)
Churches completed in 1865
19th-century Episcopal church buildings
Churches in Lewis County, New York
National Register of Historic Places in Lewis County, New York